Tauroscopa is a genus of moths of the family Crambidae.

Species
Tauroscopa gorgopis Meyrick, 1888
Tauroscopa lachnaea (Turner, 1913)
Tauroscopa notabilis Philpott, 1923
Tauroscopa trapezitis Meyrick, 1905

References

Natural History Museum Lepidoptera genus database

Crambinae
Crambidae genera
Taxa named by Edward Meyrick